Cassandra Repstock-Romme (born 26 August 2001) is a Danish retired ice hockey goaltender.

Repstock-Romme represented Denmark in the Division I Group A tournaments of the IIHF Women's World Championship in 2018 and 2019, and at the Top Division tournament in 2021. At the 2021 tournament, she maintained an excellent .926 save percentage and was selected as a top three player on the team by the coaching staff. As a junior player with the Danish national under-18 team, she participated in the 2016 IIHF World Women's U18 Championship – Division I and the 2017 IIHF World Women's U18 Championship – Division I Group B.

In November 2022, she announced her retirement.

References

External links

Living people
2001 births
People from Gentofte Municipality
Danish women's ice hockey goaltenders
Ice hockey players at the 2022 Winter Olympics
Olympic ice hockey players of Denmark
Sportspeople from the Capital Region of Denmark